Hawke's Bay Motor Co Ltd v Russell [1972] NZLR 542 is a cited case in New Zealand regarding liability in negligence, and the legal concept of res ipsa loquitur

Background
A bus owned by Hawkes Bay Motor Company was struck on a bend in a road by a car driven on the wrong side of the road by Russell. They later sued Russell for the cost of the damage, to which Russell successfully defended on the basis that he had blacked out due to a medical condition.

HBMC appealed that under res ipsa loquitur, that due to the facts here, the onus of proof should be of Russell to prove the medical condition.

Held
The court ruled that this doctrine did not apply here.

References

Court of Appeal of New Zealand cases
1972 in case law
1972 in New Zealand law
New Zealand tort case law